Reimar Kuntze (27 January 1900 – 18 August 1949) was a German cinematographer. He worked on more than 100 film productions during his career.

Selected filmography

 I.N.R.I. (1923)
 Adam and Eve (1923)
 The Hobgoblin (1924)
 Garragan (1924)
 Husbands or Lovers (1924)
 Living Buddhas (1925)
 Wood Love (1925)
 The Woman without Money (1925)
 The Captain from Koepenick (1926)
 Women and Banknotes (1926)
 Marriage Announcement (1926)
 Berlin: Symphony of a Metropolis (1927)
 One Against All (1927)
 Master and Mistress (1928)
 Dawn (1929)
 The Night Belongs to Us (1929)
 The White Devil (1930)
 Never Trust a Woman (1930)
 Fire in the Opera House (1930)
 How Do I Become Rich and Happy? (1930)
 End of the Rainbow (1930)
 The Land of Smiles (1930)
 Mädchen in Uniform (1931)
 The Typist (1931)
 The Soaring Maiden (1931)
 The Private Secretary (1931)
 The Trunks of Mr. O.F. (1931)
 Victoria and Her Hussar (1931)
 The Bartered Bride (1932)
 A Tremendously Rich Man (1932)
 Five from the Jazz Band (1932)
 Here's Berlin (1932)
 Tell Me Who You Are (1933)
 A Song Goes Round the World (1933)
  A Woman Like You (1933)
 The Emperor's Waltz (1933)
 Ripening Youth (1933)
 The Prodigal Son (1934)
 Trouble with Jolanthe (1934)
 The Private Life of Louis XIV (1935)
 If It Were Not for Music (1935)
 The Blonde Carmen (1935)
 I Was Jack Mortimer (1935)
 If We All Were Angels (1936)
 The Abduction of the Sabine Women (1936)
 The Dreamer (1936)
 When the Cock Crows (1936)
 Togger (1937)
 The Muzzle (1938)
 The Roundabouts of Handsome Karl (1938)
 The Four Companions (1938)
 Beloved Augustin (1940)
 Nanette (1940)
 The Gasman (1941)
 Much Ado About Nixi (1942)
 Love Me (1942)
 A Man with Principles? (1943)
The Master of the Estate (1943)
 The Noltenius Brothers (1945)
 Artists' Blood (1949)
 Don't Dream, Annette (1949)
 Royal Children (1950)
 Eyes of Love (1951)

References

Bibliography
 Noack, Frank. Veit Harlan: The Life and Work of a Nazi Filmmaker. University Press of Kentucky, 2016.

External links

1900 births
1949 deaths
German cinematographers
Film people from Berlin